SportA is the sports rights agency of Germany's two main public TV stations, ARD and ZDF. It is located in Maxvorstadt, Munich, Bavaria, Germany.

References 

ARD (broadcaster)
ZDF
Buildings and structures in Munich
Maxvorstadt